The Molson Brewery is a Canadian based brewery based in Montreal and was established in 1786 by the Molson family. In 2005, Molson merged with the Adolph Coors Company to become Molson Coors.

Molson Coors maintains some of its Canadian operations at the site of Molson's first brewery located on the Saint Lawrence River in Montreal.

History

Founded in 1786, the Molson Brewery is the oldest brewery in North America and continues to produce beer on the site of the original brewery.

On May 2, 1782, at the age of 18, John Molson left England for Canada, landing in Montreal on June 26. Shortly after his arrival, he began working at the Thomas Loyd brewery, which he went on to purchase at an auction in 1784.  Not long after his arrival in Montreal in 1782, Molson sensed the market potential for beer in the British colony. Prices for wine, rum and port were rising and an influx of English and Irish immigrants were particularly partial to beer. When he came of legal age, Molson used the money inherited from his parents to acquire a small brewery housed in a wooden building on the shores of the St Lawrence, just outside the fortifications of the burgeoning City of Montreal.

In 1785, he temporarily closed his business to cross the Atlantic in search of modern equipment and ingredients. Upon his return, he offered the seeds free of charge to neighbouring Montreal farmers, who agreed to grow them to satisfy the brewery's need for malt. In 1786, just six weeks after taking the helm, Molson delivered his first brew, an ale. Priced at five cents a bottle, his brew sold well.

Molson took advantage of the many business opportunities available at the time. He quickly diversified his investments, opened a lumber yard, and began issuing loans to local Montreal merchants. In 1816, the family enterprise began to take shape when founder John Molson entered into an association with his three sons, John, Jr., Thomas and William.

Although brewing proved to be Molson's most sustainable field of endeavor, other activities were added throughout the company's lengthy history. Molson was the first company to own and operate a fleet of steamboats, which were used to transport people and goods between Quebec and Ontario. John Molson and his sons also founded the Molson Bank, which later merged with the Bank of Montreal.

In 1816, John Molson formed a partnership with his three sons – John, Thomas and William. It was Thomas who would eventually follow in his father's footsteps by continuing the Molson brewing tradition and upholding high standards of quality. In 1903, inspired by the popularity of imported beers, Thomas’ grandson Herbert Molson and brew master John Hyde created Molson Export, an authentic ale brewed in the classic style, developed by John Molson.

The Molson family were pioneers in steamships and hospitality, assisted with the Montreal General Hospital, were patrons of McGill University and the arts, and until 1925, were involved in banking through Molson Bank which merged with the Bank of Montreal.

Molson Brewery expanded the breadth of its corporate activities throughout the 20th century. In 1945, the family decided to transform the company into a public, limited liability enterprise. It then became possible to acquire an ownership in the company without being a member of the Molson family. This made it possible for the company to expand into lager and inaugurate a new brewery in Toronto (near the Canadian National Exhibition) in 1955. The Crown and Anchor brand of beer dates from this time. Two years later in 1957, the family (not the firm) acquired the Montreal Forum and the Montreal Canadiens. The company continued to develop and, in 1958, acquired six breweries, which included five establishments in Western Canada, giving Molson a nationwide presence. In 1989, the company consolidated market share in Quebec through a merger with Carling O'Keefe (acquiring Carling's Toronto brewery in Etobicoke). As a result, Molson became the largest brewery in Canada and the fifth largest in the world.

Molson was once the owner of home improvement chains Beaver Lumber and Aikenhead's Home Improvement Warehouse. In February 1994, Molson sold a 75% interest in Aikenhead's to Home Depot Inc for $150 million with the option to buy the rest in 1999; in the event, they agreed on a price of $262 million. In 1997, Molson sold for CAD$147 million their interest in Reno-Depot to Castorama. In 1999 they sold Beaver Lumber to Home Hardware.

In 2005, Molson merged with US-based Coors to form Molson Coors Brewing Company. This was followed in 2007 by the opening of a new brewery in Moncton, New Brunswick. Sixth generation family member Eric Molson retired in 2009; however, his sons Andrew and Geoff Molson continue to be active in company affairs as members of the corporate Board of Directors.

On October 11, 2016, SABMiller in the U.S. sold its interests (from the joint venture formed in the United States and Puerto Rico) in MillerCoors to Molson Coors, who had been its partner in the joint venture, for around US$12 billion. Molson Coors gained full ownership of the Miller brand portfolio outside of the U.S. and Puerto Rico, and retained the rights to all of the brands that were in the MillerCoors portfolio for the U.S. and Puerto Rico.

In 2018, the company brewed and marketed a number of the most popular brands of beer in Canada. Domestic labels include Molson Canadian, Molson M, Molson Export, Molson Dry, Molson Exel Dealcoholized beer, Old Style Pilsner, Rickard's, Creemore Springs and Granville Island Brewing. Through partnerships with other major brewers, Molson Coors Canada also offers beer brands, including Coors Light, Miller Genuine Draft, Heineken, Foster's Lager and Tiger. Molson employs 3,000 people in Canada and operates five breweries in locations across the country (Vancouver, Toronto, Montreal, Moncton and St. John's), as well as the Creemore micro-brewery in Ontario and Granville Island Brewing in British Columbia.

Operations

Molson Coors Canada is a unit of Molson Coors with  operational headquarters located in Toronto (in addition to several breweries across Canada). Molson Coors Canada is part-owner of The Beer Store in Ontario (Brewers Retail Inc.), operating as a beer distribution and retail chain, which (protected by legislation) has an over 85% market share of the total Ontario industry beer sales. Molson Coors Canada owns 50% of Brewers Distribution Limited in Western Canada. Molson Coors Canada has the marketing and selling rights for Heineken in Canada.

On 30 October 2019, the Molson Coors Brewing Company announced it would change its name to Molson Coors Beverage Company as a part of a restructuring to take place in 2020. The name change would reflect the company's growing focus on beverages outside of the traditional beer and brewing offerings. Additionally, the company would reorganize its global business units, including Molson Coors Canada, into Molson Coors North America, headquartered in Chicago, and Molson Coors Europe, headquartered in Prague.

Molson Coors breweries in Canada are in:
 Longueuil, Quebec
 Toronto, Ontario – former Carling O'Keefe plant in Etobicoke, which replaced the old Lakeshore plant (demolished and replaced by WaterParkCity development in 2006)
 St. John's, Newfoundland and Labrador
 Chilliwack, British Columbia - formerly in Vancouver, British Columbia until 2019
 Creemore, Ontario – Creemore Springs
 Granville Island, British Columbia – Granville Island Brewing
 Shawinigan, Quebec – Trou du Diable
 Montreal, Quebec – Brasseur de Montréal

Former:
 Molson Brewery, Montreal, Quebec (1786-2022)
 Molson Brewery, Barrie - closed 2000
Molson Brewery, Edmonton - closed 2007
Molson Brewery, Vancouver - closed 2019
Molson Brewery, Toronto - closed 1999

Brands

Molson brands include Carling Black Label and Molson Canadian.

Relationship with NHL
On June 20, 2009, brothers Geoff Molson, Andrew Molson, and their father Eric Molson announced the purchase of 80.1% of the Montreal Canadiens from Colorado businessman George Gillett. The Canadiens have historically been the NHL's most successful hockey team and last won the Stanley Cup in 1993. Along with the current majority ownership that the Molson brothers have of the team, the Molson company has owned all or portions of the Montreal Canadiens. In June 2009, the consortium led by the Molson brothers acquired the remaining 19.9% of the team that had been held by the company.

In the second decade of the 21st century, Molson and/or Coors had exclusive rights to sell their beverages at the home arenas of the Montreal Canadiens, Ottawa Senators, Toronto Maple Leafs, Edmonton Oilers, Colorado Avalanche, Arizona Coyotes and Detroit Red Wings. Their beverages could be purchased at other sports venues, such as the home of the Buffalo Sabres, the KeyBank Center, the Philadelphia Flyers at the Wells Fargo Center, the Washington Capitals at the Verizon Center and Bridgestone Arena, home of the Nashville Predators.

Gallery

See also

 Canadian beer
 Labatt
 List of breweries in Canada
 Ken Westerfield, Molson Frisbee Team
 Molson family
 Molson Coors Beverage Company

Archives
There is a Molson fonds at Library and Archives Canada. Archival reference number is R3088.

References

External links

Official website
Molson in the Community Blog

Beer brewing companies based in Quebec
Companies established in 1786
Manufacturing companies based in Montreal
Centre-Sud
Canadian subsidiaries of foreign companies
Molson Coors Beverage Company
1786 establishments in the Province of Quebec (1763–1791)
Food and drink companies established in 1786
Food and drink companies based in Montreal
Canadian brands